Heinz Thiel (10 May 1920 – 9 March 2003) was a German film director and screenwriter. He directed more than 20 films between 1956 and 1977. His 1967 film Bread and Roses was entered into the 5th Moscow International Film Festival.

Selected filmography
 Special Mission (1959)
 Five Days, Five Nights (1960)
 Reserved for the Death (1963)
 Schwarzer Samt (1964)
 Bread and Roses (1967)
 Hart am Wind (1970)

References

External links

1920 births
2003 deaths
Film people from Saxony-Anhalt
Mass media people from Magdeburg